Ankety Low Day is the debut studio album by Tone Dogs, released on November 15, 1990, by C/Z.

Critical reception

In writing for Spin, critic Byron Coley compared the band favorably to Fish & Roses, Etron Fou Leloublan and Dos and said "Impossible to peg, elegantly crafted, their music seems soothingly familiar even at the moment your forebrain tells you that something very fucked up is happening."

Track listing

Personnel 
Adapted from the Ankety Low Day liner notes.

Tone Dogs
Matt Cameron – drums, backing vocals
Fred Chalenor – bass guitar, electric guitar, bowed guitar, keyboards, backing vocals
Amy Denio – vocals, saxophone, electric guitar, bass guitar, drums, percussion
Additional musicians
Bob Bain – guitar (4)
Courtney Von Drehle – saxophone (4)
Fred Frith – guitar, violin
Hans Reichel – idiophone, guitar

Technical personnel
Drew Canulette – engineering, mixing
Lance Limbocker – mixing assistant
Rhonda Pelikan – design
Garry Transue – painting

Release history

References

External links 
 

1990 debut albums
Tone Dogs albums
C/Z Records albums